Borella is the largest suburb in Colombo, Sri Lanka represented by divisional code 8.

Demographic

Borella is a multi-religious and multi-ethnic area. The major ethnic communities in Borella are Sinhalese and Tamils. There are also various other minorities, such as Burghers, Sri Lankan Moors and others. Religions include Buddhism, Hinduism, Islam, Christianity and various other religions and beliefs to a lesser extent.

History
The history of the settlement of Borella is dated from the 15th century as a village situated along a cart-track from the port of Colombo to Kotte. A Borella municipal market was built in 1910. Borella was also a terminus of the historical defunct Colombo tramway system. During the Black July riots in 1983, various properties in Borella were damaged.

Sports venues

Paikiasothy Saravanamuttu Stadium also known as P. Sara Oval and Tamil Union Cricket and Athletic Club.
 Royal Colombo Golf Club (also known as Ridgeway Links). Founded in 1879 it is the oldest in the country and one of the oldest in Asia.

Schools
 Sunrise International Preschool
 Wesley College
 Bandaranayake Vidyalaya
 Carey College, Borella
 Devi Balika Vidyalaya
 C. W. W. Kannangara Vidyalaya
 Susamaya Wardana Maha Vidyalaya
 Rathnawali Balika Maha Vidyalaya
 Colombo Overseas School 
 Gateway International School
 Oxford  Overseas School

Diplomatic missions

 Honorary Consulate of Zambia
 Embassy of Turkey
 Embassy of Afghanistan
 Honorary Consulate of Benin

Cemetery

Colombo's main burial ground and crematorium, Kanatte Cemetery, is located in Borella. It is situated at the intersection of Narahenpita Road (Elvitigala Mawatha), Bullers Road (Bauddhaloka Mawatha), and Baseline Road (D. S. Senanayake Mawtha) at a large traffic circle. The cemetery was established in 1840 and includes a section dedicated for those who died during World War I and II.

References

Districts of Colombo
Populated places in Western Province, Sri Lanka